Necalphus decoratus is a species of beetle in the family Cerambycidae. It was described by Monné and Magno in 1992.

References

Acanthoderini
Beetles described in 1992